Light Division is a board game published in 1989 by World Wide Wargames.

Contents
Light Division is a game in which a US military action against Iran is portrayed in an operational level game.

Reception
Lee Brimmicombe-Wood reviewed Light Division for Games International magazine, and gave it 2 stars out of 5, and stated that "To divorce the political sphere from the game turns Light Division into little more than a military arcade game and not the authentic simulation the designers like to think it is."

Reviews
Fire & Movement #72

References

3W games
Board games introduced in 1989